The Beautiful Scent is a Singaporean and Malaysian co-production Chinese drama which was telecast on Singapore's free-to-air channel, MediaCorp TV Channel 8. It was first broadcast in Malaysia in 2007. The drama made its debut in Singapore on 11 February 2008. The drama consists of a total of 25 episodes. It screened on every weekday night, 7pm.

Cast

Main cast
 Dawn Yeoh as Zeng Meili
 Pan Lingling as Winner
 Zheng Geping as Macho Tang Zhang Yao
 Cai Pei Xuan as Lin Xiao Tong
 William San as Dominic

Supporting Cast
 Leslie Chai as Chen Yong
 Aenie Wong as Wang Li Qiao
 Chen Wen Bin as Xiao Ya
 Bernard Tan as Li Cheng
 Hang Yi Ting as Mona
 Lin Pei Qi as Shi Yun 
 Xie Wen Hui as Judy
 Yue Huan as Lin Xiao Ping
 Yang Wei Wen as Wu Ying Jie
 Wee Kheng Ming as Isaac

External links
Official website
Theme song

Singaporean television series
Chinese-language drama television series in Malaysia
Singapore Chinese dramas
Singapore–Malaysia television co-productions
2008 Singaporean television series debuts
NTV7 original programming
Channel 8 (Singapore) original programming